Renán Elías Olivera (February 2, 1915 – July 7, 1941) was a Peruvian aviator who fought during the Ecuadorian–Peruvian War in 1941.

Early life
Elías was born in Ica on February 2, 1915, to parents Óscar Elías Toledo and Leonor Olivera Martínez. Elías was the third of the seven children of Óscar Elías Toledo and Leonor Olivera Martínez, as stated in his birth certificate, since he did not have a baptismal certificate since he was never baptized because his father was an atheist. He studied at the Saint Aloysius Gonzaga National University.

Military career
He joined the Aeronautical Corps of Peru on March 9, 1935, being twenty years old at the time. When the Ecuadorian–Peruvian War broke out in 1941, he was assigned a bombardment mission over Ecuador on July 7. When the squadron was returning from its mission, Elías noticed that a bomb was stuck in his plane, putting himself and his teammates at risk. As a result, he abandoned his group headed towards the ocean, with the bomb exploding only seconds after.

Legacy
Elías is considered a National Hero of Peru, along with José Quiñones, also killed in the 1941 conflict. Capitán FAP Renán Elías Olivera Airport is named after him, as is a school of the Peruvian Air Force in Chiclayo.

See also
Peruvian Air Force
Ecuadorian–Peruvian War

References

1915 births
1941 deaths
Peruvian aviators
Peruvian military personnel killed in action